Thomas Wakefield may refer to:

 Thomas Wakefield (orientalist) (died 1575), or Wakefeld, orientalist
Thomas Wakefield (politician), 14th and 15th century man of Leicester